Anbudan DD (With Love DD) is an Indian Tamil-language talk show which aired on Star Vijay on every Saturday at 18:00 (IST) starting from 1 April 2017 and 22 July 2017. The show is continuation to the show Koffee with DD and hosted by Divyadarshini.

Host
 Divyadarshini: who had appeared in many Tamil Shows Host, reality shows and Serials on television like Thadayam, Ahalya, Selvi, Arasi, Jodi Number One, Airtel super singer T20 and Koffee with DD.

List of Episodes

References

External links
Vijay TV Official Website on Hotstar
Anpudan DD on Hotstar

Star Vijay original programming
Tamil-language talk shows
Tamil-language quiz shows
2010s Tamil-language television series
2017 Tamil-language television series debuts
Tamil-language television shows
2017 Tamil-language television series endings